PP-225 Lodhran-II is a Constituency of Provincial Assembly of Punjab.

General elections 2013

See also
 PP-224 Lodhran-I
 PP-226 Lodhran-III

References

External links
 Election commission Pakistan's official website
 Awazoday.com check result
 Official Website of Government of Punjab

Provincial constituencies of Punjab, Pakistan